Satya Narayana Charka is a Kathak dancer, teacher, and choreographer.  He was taught by Pundit R.K. Shukla, Pundit Shambhu Maharaj, Shrimati Maya Rao and Birju Maharaj.  Among his many awards is the first prize in the All-India Dance Competition.  In 1981, he became the director of the East-West School of Dance in Monroe, New York.

He teaches around New York, and performs dance and dance dramas such as Shakuntala and Ramayana internationally.

Productions by Satya Narayan Chakra 

 Ramayana
 Krishna Leela 
Shakuntala 
Who is who? 
Gangavataran

References

Living people
Kathak exponents
American male artists of Indian descent
20th-century American male artists
21st-century American male artists
American male dancers
American choreographers
People from Monroe, New York
Year of birth missing (living people)